Bronco Billy is a 1980 American Western comedy-drama film starring Clint Eastwood and Sondra Locke. It was directed by Eastwood and written by Dennis Hackin.

Plot
Bronco Billy McCoy is a stuntman performing in front of a meager crowd in "Bronco Billy's Wild West Show", a rundown traveling circus reminiscent of Buffalo Bill's Wild West, of which he is the owner and operator. For the show's finale, a blindfolded Bronco Billy shoots balloons around a female assistant on a revolving wooden disc, and for the last balloon, he throws a knife. However, his assistant moves her own leg and is cut, which spurs her to quit. Due to low ticket sales, Billy has been unable to pay his employees for six months.

The show moves on to a new town and Bronco Billy goes to city hall to get a permit. He bumps into Antoinette Lily and John Arlington, who are there to be married. Antoinette despises her future husband, but has to marry before she is thirty in order to inherit a large fortune. Their car breaks down at the motel opposite the Wild West Show. The next morning, Arlington steals all her money and their repaired car. She is left to fend for herself and asks Billy McCoy for help.

Bronco Billy talks Antoinette into becoming his new assistant, "Miss Lily," though she only agrees to do one show. Her first performance is unusually successful, although Miss Lily irritates Billy by not sticking to the script.

Antoinette discovers that Arlington has been arrested for her murder (framed by Antoinette's stepmother and her scheming lawyer friend, who stand to gain her inheritance). Seizing the chance to get even with Arlington, Antoinette rejoins the Wild West Show.

Antoinette learns that none of Billy's performers are actually cowboys. Billy's crew are largely ex-convicts, alcoholics, or both. Bronco Billy was a shoe salesman from New Jersey who shot his wife for sleeping with his best friend. Nevertheless, Miss Lily begins to warm to the troupe.

Two of the show's performers announce that they are going to have a baby. The crew goes to a bar to celebrate. One gets arrested by police who discover that he is a deserter from the Army. Bronco Billy uses the show's meager savings to bribe the sheriff into letting the man go, swallowing his pride and enduring the sheriff's verbal humiliations for his friend's sake.

One night the circus tent burns down. Everyone blames Miss Lily for their bad luck, but Bronco Billy defends her and proposes that they rob a train. They try to do this in the standard Western way (riding alongside and jumping on), but a modern train proves to be resistant to such an approach and they give up.

Next, the troupe travels to a mental institution at which they have previously performed pro bono. The head of the institution, who is obsessed with the Wild West, agrees to provide them with accommodation and to supply a new tent, with the inmates helping to sew one out of American flags. Miss Lily and Bronco Billy spend the night together. By chance, one inmate turns out to be Arlington (who had been paid by a crooked lawyer to confess to being mentally disturbed when he "murdered" Antoinette). When he sees her, he raises a fuss and gets released. Bronco Billy and the show depart without Miss Lily.

Antoinette returns to her luxurious lifestyle, but she is bored and misses Billy, who drowns his loneliness with alcohol. When Bronco Billy is about to introduce Lefty as his assistant, Miss Lily appears. The show, now a raving success, runs smoothly and Bronco Billy ends it with a positive message for the children in the audience.

Cast
 Clint Eastwood as Billy "Bronco Billy" McCoy
 Sondra Locke as Antoinette Lily
 Geoffrey Lewis as John Arlington
 Scatman Crothers as "Doc" Lynch
 Bill McKinney as "Lefty" LeBow
 Sam Bottoms as Leonard James
 Dan Vadis as Chief Big Eagle
 Sierra Pecheur as Lorraine Running Water
 Walter Barnes as Sheriff Dix
 Woodrow Parfrey as Dr. Canterbury
 Beverlee McKinsey as Irene Lily
 Doug McGrath as Lieutenant Wiecker
 Hank Worden as Station Mechanic
 Tessa Richarde as Miss Mitzy
 William Prince as Edgar Lipton

Production
Eastwood received Dennis E. Hackin and Neal Dobrofsky's script and decided to join the film with Sondra Locke. The film was shot in two months in the Boise, Idaho area in the fall of 1979. Additional filming took place in eastern Oregon and New York. Filmed on a low budget of $5 million, it finished two to four weeks ahead of schedule.

Soundtrack
The soundtrack, which was headlined by Merle Haggard and Ronnie Milsap, also featured singing by Eastwood himself.

Critical reception
Eastwood has cited Bronco Billy as being one of the most affable shoots of his career, and biographer Richard Schickel has argued that the character of Bronco Billy is his most self-referential work. The film was a modest commercial hit, but was appreciated by critics. Janet Maslin of The New York Times believed the film was "the best and funniest Clint Eastwood movie in quite a while," praising Eastwood's directing and the way he intricately juxtaposes the old West and the new.

Box office performance
Although the film grossed 4-5 times its cost (some $25 million) during its United States theatrical release, Eastwood considered it insufficient. In a French interview, Eastwood spoke about the film's financial reception, "It was an old-fashioned theme, probably too old fashioned since the film didn't do as well as we hoped. But if, as a film director, I ever wanted to say something, you'll find it in Bronco Billy."

Awards and nominations
 1st Golden Raspberry Award
Nominated: Worst Actress (Sondra Locke)

See also
 List of American films of 1980

References

Bibliography

External links
 
 
 
 

1980 films
1980 comedy films
1980s action comedy films
1980s American films
1980s English-language films
1980s Western (genre) comedy films
American Western (genre) comedy films
Films about Wild West shows
Films directed by Clint Eastwood
Films set in Montana
Films set in Idaho
Films shot in Idaho
Films shot in Oregon
Neo-Western films
Warner Bros. films